The following page lists power stations in Switzerland. For traction current see List of installations for 15 kV AC railway electrification in Germany, Austria and Switzerland.

Hydroelectric

There are 556 hydroelectric power plants in Switzerland that have a capacity of at least 300 kW. Some of these are listed below:

Nuclear

Thermal

A gas turbine testing facility in Birr AG, belonging to Ansaldo Energia, sometimes feeds up to 740 megawatts into the Swiss electricity grid.

See also

 List of power stations in Europe
 List of largest power stations in the world
 List of wind farms in Switzerland

References

Switzerland
 
Lists of buildings and structures in Switzerland